Kalore is a genus of beetles in the family Cerambycidae, containing the following species:

 Kalore asanga Martins & Galileo, 2006
 Kalore minima Galileo & Martins, 2011

References

Xystrocerini